Pseudotriton is a genus of salamanders in the family Plethodontidae. They are endemic to eastern and southern United States, from New York south to Florida and west to southern Ohio, Kentucky, Tennessee, and eastern Louisiana. They are commonly known as red salamanders or mud salamanders.

Species
The number of species depends on the source. The Amphibian Species of the World lists the following three species:
 Pseudotriton diastictus Bishop, 1941 — midland mud salamander
 Pseudotriton montanus Baird, 1850 — mud salamander
 Pseudotriton ruber (Sonnini de Manoncourt and Latreille, 1801) — red salamander

However, AmphibiaWeb lists only two species as it treats Pseudotriton diastictus as a subspecies of Pseudotriton montanus, as does the International Union for Conservation of Nature.

References

 
Amphibians of North America
Endemic fauna of the United States
Extant Pleistocene first appearances
Amphibian genera
Taxa named by Johann Jakob von Tschudi
Taxonomy articles created by Polbot